Martina Kniezková (1975-2015) was a Paralympian athlete from the Czech Republic who competeted mainly in category F52 discus events.

Kniezková was born 21 August 1975 in Havířov. She competed in three Paralympic Games, each time in the discus and javelin. Her first appearance in the 2000 Summer Paralympics was her most successful, winning the F51-54 discus and finishing second in the F52-54 javelin. Then in 2004 in Athens she defended her discus title in the F32-34/51-53 class but couldn't quite win a medal in the javelin. In Beijing in the 2008 Summer Paralympics she was unable to win a medal in either the discus or javelin. She died on 24 February 2015.

References

External links
 Profile on paralympic.org
 Profile at the South Bohemian University website

Paralympic athletes of the Czech Republic
Athletes (track and field) at the 2000 Summer Paralympics
Athletes (track and field) at the 2004 Summer Paralympics
Paralympic gold medalists for the Czech Republic
Paralympic silver medalists for the Czech Republic
2015 deaths
People from Havířov
1975 births
World record holders in Paralympic athletics
Medalists at the 2000 Summer Paralympics
Medalists at the 2004 Summer Paralympics
Paralympic medalists in athletics (track and field)
Czech female discus throwers
Czech female javelin throwers
Sportspeople from the Moravian-Silesian Region